The Norwegian Refugee Council (NRC) is a humanitarian, non-governmental organisation that protects the rights of people affected by displacement. This includes refugees and internally displaced persons who are forced to flee their homes as a result of conflict, human rights violations and acute violence, as well as climate change and natural disasters.

History
NRC is politically independent and has no religious affiliation. It is the only Norwegian organisation that specialises in international efforts to provide assistance, protection and durable solutions for people affected by displacement. NRC employs approximately 16,500 staff members and incentive workers in 32 countries throughout Africa, Asia, South America, Europe and the Middle East. The NRC headquarters is located in Oslo and has about 280 employees. Additionally the organisation has a presence in Brussels, Geneva, Washington, D.C., Berlin, London and Addis Ababa.

NRC was established in 1946 under the name "Europahjelpen" ("Aid to Europe"), to assist refugees in Europe after World War II. In 1953, the organisation changed to its current name, Norwegian Refugee Council (NRC). Today NRC is organised as an independent, private foundation.

NRC's primary focus is the provision of humanitarian aid during the emergency stage of a conflict or natural disaster. It pursues a holistic, rights-based approach that includes emergency relief and early recovery while promoting resilience and sustainable solutions for displacement. 

Jan Egeland took up the position as Secretary General in August 2013, replacing Elisabeth Rasmusson who was appointed to the position of Assistant Executive Director of the World Food Programme (WFP).

Core activities 
Shelter: Emergency shelter, housing, schools and establishment of other forms of public infrastructure.

Food Security: Distribution of food and non-food relief items.

Information, counselling and legal assistance (ICLA): Focus areas include housing, land and property rights, legal documentation, statelessness and refugee status procedures.

Water, sanitation and hygiene: Access to safe drinking water, sanitation and waste management facilities.

Education: Education programs targeted children and youth.

Camp management: Coordination of services in refugee camps and IDP camps.

Agencies 
In 1998 NRC established the Internal Displacement Monitoring Centre in Geneva. The IDMC contributes to improving national and international capacities to assist people around the globe who have been displaced. IDMC also develops statistics and analysis on internal displacement, including analysis commissioned for use by the United Nations.

NORCAP is a standby roster operated by NRC and funded by the Norwegian Ministry of Foreign Affairs which consists of 650 men and women from Norway, Africa, Asia, Middle East and Latin America. Since its establishment in 1991, NORCAP's experts have been sent on more than 7000 missions worldwide.

Publications 
Perspective
NRC previously published the magazine "Perspective" four times a year. The magazine focused on the humanitarian dimensions of international politics. The magazine was on sale in more than 15 countries.

Awards and recognition
The Nansen Refugee Award is an international award that is yearly given by the UN High Commissioner for Refugees (UNHCR) to a person or group for outstanding work on behalf of the forcibly displaced. Since 2009 NRC has been working with the UNCHR for organising and carrying out the ceremony. The award consists of a commemorative medal and a US$100,000 monetary prize donated by the governments of Norway and Switzerland.

2012 kidnapping incident
In July 2012, two vehicles carrying a high-level Norwegian Refugee Council delegation were ambushed outside of a Dadaab camp. A driver was killed and four international staff were abducted. According to the Norwegian Refugee Council spokesman a risk analysis had been carried out before movements through Dadaab and it was declared safe for travel. A Kenyan police commander said that a security escort had been arranged to accompany the delegation but the group declined.

References

External links 
Official website (English version)
Internal Displacement Monitoring Centre (IDMC)
NORCAP
The Nansen Refugee Award

Development charities based in Norway
Foundations based in Norway
Human rights organisations based in Norway
Organisations based in Oslo
Organizations established in 1946
Refugee aid organizations in Europe
1946 establishments in Norway